Lutsenkovo is a rural locality (a selo) and the administrative center of Lutsenkovskoye Rural Settlement, Alexeyevsky District, Belgorod Oblast, Russia. The population was 580 as of 2010. There are 5 streets.

Geography 
Lutsenkovo is located 37 km southeast of Alexeyevka (the district's administrative centre) by road. Babichev is the nearest rural locality.

References 

Rural localities in Alexeyevsky District, Belgorod Oblast
Biryuchensky Uyezd